Batyushkov may refer to:

 Konstantin Batyushkov (1787–1855), Russian poet, essayist and translator
 Fyodor Batyushkov (1857–1920), Russian philologist and critic